Betz is a surname. Notable people with the surname include:

 Albert Betz (1885–1968), physicist
 Anton Betz (1893-1984), German journalist and publisher 
 Carl Betz (1921–1978), actor
 Claire Betz (1921–2014), part-owner of the Philadelphia Phillies
 Don Betz, university president
 Franz Betz (1835–1900), opera singer
 Georg Betz (1903–1945), military officer
 Gregor Betz (born 1948), swimmer
 Hans Betz (born 1931), rower
 Hans Dieter Betz (born 1931), scholar of religion
 Hans-Dieter Betz (born 1940), physicist
 Hans-Georg Betz, academic
 Jonathan Betz, journalist
 Matthew Betz (1881–1938), actor
 Pauline Betz (1919–2011), tennis player
 Peter Betz (1929–1991), rower
 Vladimir Betz (1834–1894), scientist
 Wim Betz (born 1943), physician